Friderich Martens (1635 - 1699) was a German physician and naturalist who conducted the first scientific observations of the nature, animal life and climate of Svalbard. He published his notes in the book "Spitzbergische oder Groenlandische Reise-Beschreibung, gethan im Jahre 1671" and this book became a reference work for many decades.

Biography
There is very little documentation on Martens' life. He was born in 1635 and worked as a feldsher and physician in Hamburg.

In 1671 Martens joined a voyage on a whaler through the Norwegian Sea to Spitsbergen. The Jonas im Walfisch, under captain Pieter Pieterszoon van Friesland, left Hamburg on 15 April 1671 heading north. The vessel left Spitsbergen on 22 July again reaching the Elbe on 21 August the same year. Martens made detailed notes of his observations and compiled these in his book "Spitzbergische oder Groenlandische Reise-Beschreibung, gethan im Jahre 1671" which was published in 1675  by Gottfried Schulzen in Hamburg. The book contains observations of the ocean and weather and descriptions of a number of arctic plants, birds and animals complete with many drawings. There are also the first notes on the ivory gull prior to the thorough description by Constantine Phipps and the Brünnich's guillemot prior to the thorough description by Morten Brünnich

Martens' book was later translated into several languages and was published in Italian (1680), Dutch (1685), English (1694; as a section of a book) and French (1715; as an article).

Martens died in 1699 at the age of sixty-four.

Legacy
The book remained a reference work for many years and was quoted among others by Constantine Phipps 1774 in "A Voyage towards the North Pole undertaken … 1773", Jacques-Henri Bernardin de Saint-Pierre 1796 in "Études de la nature" and Bernard Germain de Lacépède 1804 in "Histoire naturelle des cétacés".

In 1861 Swedish explorer Adolf Erik Nordenskiöld named Martensøya, an island among the Sjuøyane in honor of Friderich Martens 

The National Library of Finland at the University of Helsinki keeps an original copy of a Dutch edition printed in 1710, of which a digital copy is available.

In 2002 a reprint was released in Berlin.

In 2007 El Museo del Fin del Mundo (Usuahia, Argentina) based on a 1711 copy manuscript kept in its collection, published a Spanish translation of the book.

References

External links
  Original book, digitized 2006 at Oxford University
 Original book complete with illustrations, digitized by the Internet Archive.
 English translation published as part of John Narborough's An Account of Several Late Voyages and Discoveries, London 1711, digitized by the Internet Archive.

1635 births
1699 deaths
17th-century German physicians
German explorers
Explorers of the Arctic
17th-century German writers
17th-century German male writers